Ángel Críspulo Jara Saguier (Asunción, 1 October 1936 — 15 September 2008) was a Paraguayan footballer. Ángel is one of the seven Jara Saguier brothers that played professional football in Paraguay.

He played for Cerro Porteño, before joining France, where he played for Toulouse (Ligue 1), Red Star (Ligue 1 and Ligue 2) and RC Besançon (Ligue 2).

External links and references

 Biography
 

1936 births
2008 deaths
Sportspeople from Asunción
Paraguayan footballers
Paraguay international footballers
Association football midfielders
Cerro Porteño players
Expatriate footballers in France
Red Star F.C. players
Racing Besançon players
Ligue 1 players
Ligue 2 players